Accidental Meeting may refer to:
 Accidental Meeting (1994 film), an American made-for-television thriller film
 Accidental Meeting (1936 film), a Soviet action comedy film